Zijingang Campus Zhejiang University is a metro station on Line 5 of the Hangzhou Metro in China. It is located in the Xihu District of Hangzhou and it serves the Zijingang Campus of Zhejiang University.

References

Railway stations in Zhejiang
Railway stations in China opened in 2019
Hangzhou Metro stations